Acilius duvergeri is a species of beetle in family Dytiscidae. It is found in Algeria, Italy, Morocco, Portugal, and Spain.

References

Dytiscidae
Beetles described in 1982
Beetles of North Africa
Beetles of Europe
Taxonomy articles created by Polbot